Budai Farkasok KKUK  is a Hungarian team handball club from Budaörs, that plays in the Nemzeti Bajnokság I.

Crest, colours, supporters

Kits

Sports hall information

Name: – Budaörs Városi Uszoda Sportcsarnok és Strand (BVUSS)
City: – Budaörs
Capacity: – 1000
Address: – 2040 Budaörs, Hársfa u. 6.

Management

Team

Current squad 

Squad for the 2022–23 season

Technical staff
 Head coach:  Ádám Korsós
 Goalkeeping coach:  István Dányi
 Fitness coach:  Gábor Schandl
 Masseur:  László Kivés
 Physiotherapist:  Beáta Csizmadia
 Club doctor:  Dr. Gergő Zelenák

Transfers
Transfers for the 2022–23 season

Joining 
  Tomislav Kvastek (LP) from  RK Zamet
  Matej Vuleta (CB) from  RK Bjelovar
  Enomoto Yuga (RB) from  Kecskeméti TE
  Pál Merkovszki (GK) from  Gyöngyösi KK
  Lajos Nánási (GK) from  BFKA-Veszprém
  Félix Turák (LP) on loan from  Ferencvárosi TC
  Abdeldjalil Zennadi (LP) from  MC Alger

Leaving 
  Ádám Korsós (CB) (retires)
  Balázs Boros (RB) to  PLER KC
  Kristóf Bende (GK)

Previous squads

Honours

Recent seasons
Seasons in Nemzeti Bajnokság I: 1
Seasons in Nemzeti Bajnokság I/B: 4

Notable former players

 Mohamed Yassine Benmiloud (2019–)
 Pál Merkovszki (2018–2019, 2022–)
 Gábor Pálos (2019–2020)
 Abdeldjalil Zennadi (2023–)
 Tomislav Kvastek (2022–)
 Matej Vuleta (2022–)
 Mateo Dioris (2017–2018)
 Khaled Essam (2021–)
 Enomoto Yuga (2022–)

Former coaches

References

External links
  
 

Hungarian handball clubs
Sport in Pest County